The Marina Mall Chennai (Opened: 15 February 2019) is a shopping centre located in OMR Egattur in Chennai, Tamil Nadu, India. It is the largest shopping mall located in the OMR area. It opened its doors to the public on February 15, 2019; it has a 550,000 sq ft leasable space which includes more than 120 shops and services and includes parking with 1,200 parking lots for both cars and bikes.

History 
Mr. Syed Abdul Kader also known as (HAC) in Kilakarai, and his children Mr.Mohammed Mukrim, Mrs.Aysha Fathima and Mr.Sayeed Aslam, partnered with Allied Investments & Housing Limited a famous real estate promoter across Tamil Nadu, constructed and established the shopping mall on a large plot of land belonging to Mr Syed Abdul Kader.

Leadership 
The mall is promoted by OMR mall developers which was founded in 2008 by Mohammed Mukrim Syed Habeeb, Mr Abdul Wadood and Mr Aslam Packeer Mohamed. Mr Mukrim is the CEO, Director and Head of the Department of finance of OMR mall developers, and Mr Aslam is the managing director of OMR mall developer. Finally, Mr Abdul Wadood is CEO of Allied Investments & Housing Ltd. Any major decisions related to the mall would be discussed and decided by these three partners.

Amenities 
The mall offers shopping, and entertainment. It includes anchor tenants such as Lifestyle, Home centre, Spar Hypermarket, and other large and small brands. It is also home to an eight screen multiplex operated by INOX cinemas with a total seating capacity of 1,750. One of the screens is nearly 25 meters wide and arguably the largest in India (Bigpix) . There is also an Australian based game centre known as Timezone, and a trampoline park located in the terrace on the 5th floor known as Dugout along with its very own small canteen. The mall has nine fine dining restaurants and 18 food stalls on the 2nd floor. It has more than 1,200 parking lots for both 2 wheelers and 4 wheelers.

References 

Shopping malls in Chennai
2019 establishments in Tamil Nadu
Shopping malls established in 2019
Shopping malls in Tamil Nadu
Shopping malls in India